Acanthoplus is a genus of African bush crickets in the subfamily Hetrodinae and tribe Acanthoplini (but placed previously in the Bradyporinae).

Species 
A. armativentris — corn cricket
A. bechuanus
A. cervinus — corn cricket
A. desertorum
A. discoidalis — armoured katydid, corn cricket
A. germanus
A. innotatus
A. jallae
A. loandae
A. longipes — long-legged armoured katydid
A. pallidus
A. serratus
A. spiseri
A. stratiotes
A. varicornis
A. weidneri

References

Tettigoniinae
Tettigoniidae genera